This is a list of radio stations in Hong Kong.

Terrestrial radio stations
As of September 2017, there are three licensed broadcasters of terrestrial radio in Hong Kong, broadcasting on both MW (AM) and FM bands. An underground radio station "Citizens' Radio" also broadcasts on FM without a licence.

Government radio-television station:
Radio Television Hong Kong (RTHK)
 RTHK Radio 1 (FM 92.6 MHz - 94.4 MHz)
 RTHK Radio 2 (FM 94.8 MHz - 96.9 MHz)
 RTHK Radio 3 (AM 567 kHz, AM 1584 kHz/FM 106.8 MHz Hong Kong South, FM 97.9 MHz Happy Valley, Jardine's Lookout, Parkview Corner, FM 107.8 MHz Tseung Kwan O, Tin Shui Wai)
 RTHK Radio 4 (FM 97.6 MHz - 98.9 MHz)
 RTHK Radio 5 (AM 783 kHz, FM 99.4 MHz Tseung Kwan O, FM 106.8 MHz Tuen Mun, Yuen Long, FM 92.3 MHzTin Shui Wai, FM 95.2 MHz Happy Valley, Jardine's Lookout, Parkview Corner)
 RTHK Radio 6 (AM 675 kHz) (24-hour relay of China National Radio)
 RTHK Putonghua Channel (AM 621 kHz, FM 100.9 MHz Causeway Bay, Wan Chai, Tuen Mun, FM 103.3 MHz Tseung Kwan O, Tin Shui Wai)
 RTHK Radio The Greater Bay (FM 102.8 MHz)

Commercial radio stations:
Commercial Radio
 Supercharged 881 (FM 88.1 MHz - 89.5 MHz)
 Ultimate 903 (FM 90.3 MHz - 92.1 MHz)
 AM864 (AM 864 kHz)
 Metro Radio Hong Kong
 Metro Info (FM 99.7 MHz - 102.1 MHz)
 Metro Finance (FM 102.4 MHz - 106.3 MHz)
 Metro Plus (AM 1044 kHz)

Underground radio station:
 Citizens' Radio
 FM1028 (FM 102.8 MHz)
 www.hklatino.com

Cessation of digital audio broadcasting (DAB)
Four digital radio broadcasters operated in Hong Kong from 2010 to 2017. Following the withdrawal of the three commercial broadcasters and a review of DAB services, the government announced that all five remaining DAB stations operated by RTHK will cease from 4 September 2017.

Internet radio stations

In operation
 Apple FM (Since 2002)
 Format: Western oldies 50's to 80's with some local hits.
 Asia Expat Radio
 Genre: Local and International News, Sport and Music
 Citizens' Radio 民間電台 (FM 102.8 MHz) (Since 2005)
 Digital Radio Hong Kong
 Slogan: Music Hong Kong Likes
 D100 Radio (Since 2012)
 PBS台 (Free)
 香港台 (Membership)
 第三台 (Membership)
 第四台 (Membership)
 D100
 Edmond Poon 恐怖在線
 HK Peanuts 香港花生
 Made in Hong Kong TV 香港製造網絡電視 (Since 2017)
 memehk 謎米香港 (Since 2013)
 MyRadio (Since 2007)
 onairpower.com 重力媒體 (Since 2006)
 OurRadio 網上電台 (Since 2007)
 Passion Times 熱血時報 (Since 2012)
 Radio Lantau
 Genre: Surf, Instrumental, Punk, Powerpop Funk, Soul, Jazz and Alternative Rock
 RagaZine (Since 2012)
 Talkonly 講台
 W-Channel 王道財經
 Genre: Financial News

Ceased operation
 Channel i
 Education Channel
 Ears Online
 FM101
 Gay Radio Hong Kong
 HKGFM
 Asia Hitz
 Awesome 80s
 Chill-Out
 Classics Rewind
 The Indie Underground
 HKGFM Club
 Today's Mix
 The 90s
 HK Nepali Radio (Nepali Language)
 Holy Vision Radio (Nepali Language)
 Hong Kong People Reporter 香港人網
 IBHK (Internet Broadcasting Hong Kong)
 IBHK Radio One (News and Politics)
 IBHK HD One
 IBHK HD Two
 IBHK Radio Two (Infotainment)
 IBHK Radio Three (Asian Pop)
 IBHK Radio Four (Classical Music)
 Open Radio Hong Kong 開台
 People's Radio Hong Kong 香港人民廣播電台
 PPStation
 Radio Mangsebung (Nepali Language)
 Stage

See also
Media of Hong Kong 
People's Radio Hong Kong

References

External links
Frequency Table for Analogue Sound Broadcasting Services in Hong Kong - Office of Communications Authority
List of Digital Audio Broadcasting Services in Hong Kong - Office of Communications Authority

Radio stations

Hong Kong